The 2010 Tour of Oman was the first edition of the Tour of Oman cycling stage race. It was rated as a 2.1 event on the UCI Asia Tour, and held from 14 February to 19 February 2010, in Oman.

Teams
Sixteen teams competed in the 2010 Tour of Oman. These included ten UCI ProTour teams, five UCI Professional Continental teams, and one Continental team. Each team entered a squad of eight riders, giving the Tour a peloton of 128 riders.

The teams that participated in the race were:

Trek-Livestrong U23

Stages

Stage 1
14 February 2010 – Muscat Corniche, 

The Frenchman Jimmy Casper outsprinted the peloton.

The first stage was a night time stage along a 16 lap course in Muscat Corniche. This night racing made the first couple of laps cautious because the riders had to race without headlights and did not want to risk an accident.

Stage 2
15 February 2010 – Nizwa to Samail, 

Daniele Bennati won the stage in a sprint finish. It was his first victory since February 28, 2009. He outsprinted American sprinter Tyler Farrar and Norway's Edvald Boasson Hagen to get the victory. He dedicated the race to Franco Ballerini, an Italian cyclist who died February 7, 2010.

In the Tour of Qatar Daniele Bennati helped out his team mate Francesco Chicchi but today was the reverse. With no one making a move with 300m to go so Bennati jumped and had enough speed to hold off the other sprinters. He credits his team mates Francesco Chicchi and Daniel Oss for giving him a great lead out. This victory put Bennati in a comfortable 3rd position overall with the same time as the leader.

The three riders tied for first are (in order): Edvald Boasson Hagen, Jimmy Casper, and Daniele Bennati.

Stage 3
16 February 2010 – Saifat Ash Shiekh to Qurayyat, 
's Edvald Boasson Hagen confirmed that he is the big favourite to win the first edition of the Tour of Oman by winning Tuesday's third stage to Qurayyat and extending his overall lead.

The 22-year-old Norwegian got a perfect leadout from his teammates, responded to a late surge by the  team and then accelerated to the line to win with his arms waving in celebration. 's Danilo Napolitano was 2nd and Tyler Farrar was 3rd.

The 10 second time bonus won in the stage puts him 10 seconds ahead of Tyler Farrar who is in 2nd place.

Stage 4
17 February 2010 – Ibri to Nakhal, 

Australia's Leigh Howard won the stage with a fine sprint on the slightly uphill finish.

 riders let a six-rider break gain almost seven minutes in the first hour and then were angry when no other teams were willing to help them chase the break.

Several riders claimed that the  riders vented their anger on the peloton by blasting through the feed zone and then put the peloton in the gutter by riding a half-road echelon when the wind changed direction.

That especially angered , who retaliated by splitting the race when Edvald Boasson Hagen stopped to uninate 55 km from the finish. Because he was race leader, Edvald Boasson Hagen had perhaps thought the peloton would wait for him, but in the heat of battle, nobody did and 41 riders group quickly formed an echelon and accelerated up the road. Boasson Hagen never caught up to the peloton and as a result finished 1'05" behind Leigh Howard and is currently in 34th position.

Stage 5
18 February 2010 – Wattayat to Sultan Qaboos Stadium, 

's Tom Boonen took his third win in 11 days of racing in the Gulf, winning a hectic sprint at the end of stage five of the Tour of Oman. Boonen won two stages in the Tour of Qatar and seemed back to his very best.

Tom Boonen got an excellent leadout from his teammates and then dug deep to find an extra bit of speed to beat 's Juan Jose Haedo.

The win put Tom Boonen 2 seconds behind the overall leader, Daniele Bennati.

After five days of racing, 26 riders are still within 16 seconds in the overall standings and so Friday's 18.5 km time trial will decide the winner of the inaugural Tour of Oman.

Stage 6
19 February 2010 – Al Jissah to Muscat Corniche,  (ITT)
Edvald Boasson Hagen of  won the 6th and final stage in the Tour of Oman, but time trialest Fabian Cancellara placed 2nd on the stage (17 seconds behind Edvald Boasson Hagen) which gave him the overall victory.

The win made Edvald Boasson Hagen as the youth classifications winner, as well as the green jersey for the overall points winner. Edvald Boasson Hagen hit speeds of almost 100 km/h  on the fast downhill section following the second climb and swept up the riders in front of him throughout his ride.

Cancellara revealed he will not race again until the Eroica in Tuscany in early March. His winter training was disrupted by illness in January but he is now satisfied that he is back on schedule.

He is still some way from the Cancellara who can dominate Milan–San Remo, Paris–Roubaix and beat everyone in the big time trials, but his overall victory showed his class and experience. He was always in the right place during the decisive moments of the race and then used his time trialing skills and ability to hurt himself and come out on top. Cancellera was satisfied with his victory but admits he was hurting very much and that there is a lot of room for improvement for the big races later in the season.

Classification leadership

For Stage 2, Kenny De Haes wore the green jersey.

For Stages 3 and 4, Tyler Farrar wore the green jersey, and Kristof Vandewalle wore the white jersey.

For Stage 5, Leigh Howard wore the white jersey.

References

External links

        

2010
2010 in road cycling
2010 in Omani sport